Trudering (Central Bavarian: Trudaring) is a district of the Trudering-Riem borough of Munich, Germany. It is primarily residential, and offers access to both the metropolitan U-Bahn and S-Bahn at München Trudering railway station and Gronsdorf railway station. Its main traffic artery is the Wasserburger Landstraße (officially named B304). 

Quarters of Munich